This is a list of bestselling novels in the United States in the 1930s, as determined by Publishers Weekly. The list features the most popular novels of each year from 1930 through 1939.

The standards set for inclusion in the lists – which, for example, led to the exclusion of the novels in the Harry Potter series from the lists for the 1990s and 2000s – are currently unknown.

1930
 Cimarron by Edna Ferber
 Exile by Warwick Deeping
 The Woman of Andros by Thornton Wilder
 Years of Grace by Margaret Ayer Barnes
 Angel Pavement by J. B. Priestley
 The Door by Mary Roberts Rinehart
 Rogue Herries by Hugh Walpole
 Chances by A. Hamilton Gibbs
 Young Man of Manhattan by Katharine Brush
 Twenty-Four Hours by Louis Bromfield

1931
 The Good Earth by Pearl S. Buck
 Shadows on the Rock by Willa Cather
 A White Bird Flying by Bess Streeter Aldrich
 Grand Hotel by Vicki Baum
 Years of Grace by Margaret Ayer Barnes
 The Road Back by Erich Maria Remarque
 The Bridge of Desire by Warwick Deeping
 Back Street by Fannie Hurst
 Finch's Fortune by Mazo de la Roche
 Maid in Waiting by John Galsworthy

1932
 The Good Earth by Pearl S. Buck
 The Fountain by Charles Langbridge Morgan
 Sons by Pearl S. Buck
 Magnolia Street by Louis Golding
 The Sheltered Life by Ellen Glasgow
 Old Wine and New by Warwick Deeping
 Mary's Neck by Booth Tarkington
 Magnificent Obsession by Lloyd C. Douglas
 Inheritance by Phyllis Bentley
 Three Loves by A. J. Cronin

1933
 Anthony Adverse by Hervey Allen
 As the Earth Turns by Gladys Hasty Carroll
 Ann Vickers by Sinclair Lewis
 Magnificent Obsession by Lloyd C. Douglas
 One More River by John Galsworthy
 Forgive Us Our Trespassers by Lloyd C. Douglas
 The Master of Jalna by Mazo de la Roche
 Miss Bishop by Bess Streeter Aldrich
 The Farm by Louis Bromfield
 Little Man, What Now? by Hans Fallada

1934
 Anthony Adverse by Hervey Allen
 Lamb in His Bosom by Caroline Miller
 So Red the Rose by Stark Young
 Good-bye, Mr. Chips by James Hilton
 Within This Present by Margaret Ayer Barnes
 Work of Art by Sinclair Lewis
 Private Worlds by Phyllis Bottome
 Mary Peters by Mary Ellen Chase
 Oil for the Lamps of China by Alice Tisdale Hobart
 Seven Gothic Tales by Isak Dinesen

1935
 Green Light by Lloyd C. Douglas
 Vein of Iron by Ellen Glasgow
 Of Time and the River by Thomas Wolfe
 Time Out of Mind by Rachel Field
 Good-bye, Mr. Chips by James Hilton
 The Forty Days of Musa Dagh by Franz Werfel
 Heaven's My Destination by Thornton Wilder
 Lost Horizon by James Hilton
 Come and Get It by Edna Ferber
 Europa by Robert Briffault

1936
 Gone with the Wind by Margaret Mitchell
 The Last Puritan by George Santayana
 Sparkenbroke by Charles Langbridge Morgan
 Drums Along the Mohawk by Walter D. Edmonds
 It Can't Happen Here by Sinclair Lewis
 White Banners by Lloyd C. Douglas
 The Hurricane by Charles Nordhoff and James Norman Hall
 The Thinking Reed by Rebecca West
 The Doctor by Mary Roberts Rinehart
 Eyeless in Gaza by Aldous Huxley

1937
 Gone with the Wind by Margaret Mitchell
 Northwest Passage by Kenneth Roberts
 The Citadel by A. J. Cronin
 And So—Victoria by Vaughan Wilkins
 Drums Along the Mohawk by Walter D. Edmonds
 The Years by Virginia Woolf
 Theatre by W. Somerset Maugham
 Of Mice and Men by John Steinbeck
 The Rains Came by Louis Bromfield
 We Are Not Alone by James Hilton

1938
 The Yearling by Marjorie Kinnan Rawlings
 The Citadel by A. J. Cronin
 My Son, My Son! by Howard Spring
 Rebecca by Daphne du Maurier
 Northwest Passage by Kenneth Roberts
 All This, and Heaven Too by Rachel Field
 The Rains Came by Louis Bromfield
 And Tell of Time by Laura Krey
 The Mortal Storm by Phyllis Bottome
 Action at Aquila by Hervey Allen

1939
 The Grapes of Wrath by John Steinbeck
 All This, and Heaven Too by Rachel Field
 Rebecca by Daphne du Maurier
 Wickford Point by John P. Marquand
 Escape by Ethel Vance
 Disputed Passage by Lloyd C. Douglas
 The Yearling by Marjorie Kinnan Rawlings
 The Tree of Liberty by Elizabeth Page
 The Nazarene by Sholem Asch
 Kitty Foyle by Christopher Morley

References

Bestselling novels in the United States
Novels
1930s books